Wanda Marianna Panfil-González (born 26 January 1959 in Tomaszów Mazowiecki) is a former long-distance runner from Poland, who won the world title in the women's marathon at the 1991 World Championships in Athletics in Tokyo, Japan. She was married to Mexican long-distance runner Mauricio González.

Panfil twice competed for her native country at the Summer Olympics; in 1988 when she finished 22nd with a 2:34:35, and in 1992 when she finished in 22nd position with a 2:47:27 in the women's marathon. During her career she won the London Marathon, the Boston Marathon, the New York City Marathon and the Nagoya Marathon. In 1990 and 1991 she was named Polish Sportswoman of the Year. Panfil is a four-time national champion in the women's 5.000 metres.

Achievements

See also
Polish records in athletics

References
  Polish Olympic Committee
  sports-reference

1959 births
People from Tomaszów Mazowiecki
Living people
Polish female long-distance runners
Polish female marathon runners
London Marathon female winners
Athletes (track and field) at the 1988 Summer Olympics
Athletes (track and field) at the 1992 Summer Olympics
Olympic athletes of Poland
Boston Marathon female winners
New York City Marathon female winners
World Athletics Championships medalists
Polish athletics coaches
Sportspeople from Łódź Voivodeship
Goodwill Games medalists in athletics
World Athletics Championships winners
Competitors at the 1990 Goodwill Games
20th-century Polish women
21st-century Polish women